Jefferson Township is an inactive township in Scotland County, in the U.S. state of Missouri.

Jefferson Township was erected in 1844, taking its name from President Thomas Jefferson.

References

Townships in Missouri
Townships in Scotland County, Missouri